Eubranchus rustyus, the homely aeolid, is a species of sea slug or nudibranch, a marine gastropod mollusc in the family Eubranchidae.

Distribution
This species was described from Monterey Bay, California. It is considered by most authors to be a synonym of Eubranchus occidentalis.

Biology
This nudibranch feeds on the hydroids Obelia and Plumularia.

References

 Turgeon, D.; Quinn, J.F.; Bogan, A.E.; Coan, E.V.; Hochberg, F.G.; Lyons, W.G.; Mikkelsen, P.M.; Neves, R.J.; Roper, C.F.E.; Rosenberg, G.; Roth, B.; Scheltema, A.; Thompson, F.G.; Vecchione, M.; Williams, J.D. (1998). Common and scientific names of aquatic invertebrates from the United States and Canada: mollusks. 2nd ed. American Fisheries Society Special Publication, 26. American Fisheries Society: Bethesda, MD (USA). . IX, 526 + cd-rom pp.

Eubranchidae
Gastropods described in 1961
Taxa named by Ernst Marcus (zoologist)